Laurila is a Finnish surname. Notable people with the surname include:

Henri Laurila (born 1980), Finnish ice hockey defenceman 
Kalevi Laurila (1937–1991), Finnish cross country skier 
Kelly Laurila Canadian academic
Liisa Laurila (born 1974), Finnish synchronized swimmer 
Maija Laurila (born 1983), Finnish racing cyclist

Finnish-language surnames